The Engelberger Rotstock is a mountain of the Urner Alps, overlooking Engelberg. It lies on the border between the Swiss cantons of Obwalden and Uri.

References

External links
 Engelberger Rotstock on Hikr

Mountains of the Alps
Mountains of Switzerland
Mountains of Obwalden
Mountains of the canton of Uri
Obwalden–Uri border